Eaglebrook School is an independent junior boarding and day school for boys in grades six through nine. It is located in Deerfield, Massachusetts, on the Pocumtuck Range near Deerfield Academy and sited on an  campus which is also preserved by the Deerfield Wildlife Trust. Eaglebrook School is accredited by the Association of Independent Schools in New England (AISNE).

Eaglebrook has a student body of approximately 250 boys in grades six, seven, eight, and nine (forms 3 through 6). Girls may only attend if their parents work or live on campus.  Eaglebrook has its own alpine ski area (the Easton Ski Area), indoor 25-yard six-lane swimming pool, and a state-of-the-art hockey rink arena indoors. Whipple Pond, located in the center of campus, is stocked with trout and bass for fishing in the spring and fall. In the winter the pond serves as the water source for snowmaking. The Chase Learning Center, at the heart of campus, includes classrooms and a multi-purpose assembly area which is called the "Pit". There are three other classroom buildings for science, language, and arts, including digital photography, woodworking shops, stained glass, stone carving, black and white photography, and many more.

Part of Eaglebrook School's mission is "to help each boy come in to full and confident possession of his innate talents, to improve the skills needed for the challenges of secondary school, and to establish values that will allow him to be a person who respects individual differences and acts with thoughtfulness and humanity."

History 

Eaglebrook School was founded in 1922 by Howard Gibbs, a friend of Headmaster Frank Boyden of Deerfield Academy. Gibbs, who graduated from Amherst, envisioned a younger boy's boarding school that allowed boys to develop their innate abilities, discover new interests, and gain confidence.

Thurston Chase, an Eaglebrook teacher and Williams College graduate, took over the school after Mr. Gibbs' unexpected death. Student enrollment was expanded, and the school grew to include a gymnasium, tennis courts, a learning center, a science building, and four new dormitories.

After Thurston Chase's retirement, his son, Stuart Chase, became the headmaster. The school continued to grow as it bought 500 adjacent acres and added new playing fields, a track, a ski area with snow making and chair lift, a swimming pool, and two new dormitories.

In 2002, Andrew Chase,  son of Stuart and Eaglebrook's former director of development, became the current headmaster.

The campus has undergone extensive massive upgrades since the mid-1990s. Baines House and the Thurston C. Chase Learning Center have been renovated.  The Schwab Family Pool, and the McFadden Rink at Alfond Arena and a new track and field facility have been built in the late 1990s. Two new dormitories, Kravis House and Mayer House, were completed in the early 2000s. In 2007, a major renovation was undertaken on Flagler House, Halsted House, and Taylor House. The Learning Center was also extensively renovated at that time. During the summer of 2010, the Sports Center was renovated, adding two new international squash courts, bringing the total to six, a new student lounge and student fitness room, and a 50-kilowatt solar panel system on the roof of the gym. The Edward P. Evans Academic Center for Science, Art, and Music, was opened in 2017.

Governance
Eaglebrook is owned by the Allen-Chase Foundation, a nonprofit educational trust. The foundation receives gifts from parents, friends, and alumni of the school and uses those gifts to enhance facilities, create endowed chairs for many faculty positions, provide a fund for professional development, and maintain a scholarship program.

Dormitories 
Dorms at Eaglebrook are a critical part of the community experience. They are distinct communities within the greater Eaglebrook community and compete in inter-dorm competitions such as Field Day and Winter Carnival. Most dorms house students from all forms, with the exception of Eagle's Nest, which only houses 5th and 6th form (8th and 9th grade) students. In addition, day students (those who do not live on campus) are associated with one of the dorms on campus and join advisory groups for home nights, biweekly events in which students don't have homework and instead spend the night eating and socializing with their assigned advisor and fellow students.

Dorms: 
Flagler House
Halsted House – Named after trustee Henry M. Halsted Jr.
Kravis House – Named after Henry Kravis
Mayer House – Named after trustee Gerry Mayer
Taylor House
Eagle's Nest (2018)
Former: The Lodge and Lodge Wing, Keith House, Macy House (Now Taylor House), Baines House, Benton House, Thurber House, Stoddard House, Gibbs House, Bancker House and Wood House (the Cubies)

Athletics 
Many sports are offered:

Fall athletic offerings
Cross Country
Football
Mountain Biking
Soccer
Water Polo
Pickleball

Winter athletic offerings
Basketball
Ice Hockey
Skiing (competitive and recreational)
Ski Patrol
Snowboarding
Squash
Swimming

Spring athletic offerings
Lacrosse
Baseball
Golf
Tennis
Track and Field
Ultimate Disc
Eaglebrook Outdoor Program

Notable alumni 

King Abdullah II of Jordan
Michael Beschloss
Barry Bingham Jr.
Henry Bromell '63, author, television writer/producer
Nick Bromell
Doug Burden
Ennis Cosby
Cameron Douglas, actor
Michael Douglas '60, actor, director
Peter Duchin, pianist, orchestra leader
Chris Hedges '71, author, war correspondent, activist
Thomas Hoving, former director of the Metropolitan Museum of Art
J. B. Jackson, writer, publisher, instructor, sketch artist in landscape design
Henry Kravis '60, investment banker, philanthropist
Lewis "Scooter" Libby '65
Rusty Magee '70
Laurence Mark '64 film producer
Mark Whitney Mehran
Christopher Mellon
Eugene F. Rice, Jr.
Duncan Sheik '86
Vin Suprynowicz '65, libertarian newspaper columnist
Chris Waddell, Paralympics skiing champion
Jason Wu, fashion designer
Tony Dalton, Mexican-American actor

References

External links
Eaglebrook School – Official site
Eaglebrook School – The Association of Independent Schools in New England (AISNE)
The Association of Boarding Schools profile
 Profile – boardingschoolreview.com

Deerfield, Massachusetts
Private middle schools in Massachusetts
Schools in Franklin County, Massachusetts
Boys' schools in the United States
1922 establishments in Massachusetts
Boarding schools in Massachusetts